Staropoltavsky District is an administrative district (raion), one of the thirty-three in Volgograd Oblast, Russia. Municipally, it is incorporated as Staropoltavsky Municipal District. It is located in the northeast of the oblast. Its administrative center is the rural locality (a selo) of Staraya Poltavka. Population:  23,633 (2002 Census);  The population of Staraya Poltavka accounts for 20.1% of the district's total population.

References

Notes

Sources

Districts of Volgograd Oblast